Ava Fabian (born April 4, 1962, in Brewster, New York) is an American model and actress. She was chosen as Playboy's Playmate of the Month in August 1986 and has appeared in numerous Playboy videos. Her centerfold was photographed by Arny Freytag and Richard Fegley. Fabian is also a former Playboy Bunny.

Fabian played Roxy Carmichael in the movie Welcome Home, Roxy Carmichael, starring Winona Ryder. She has appeared in The Drew Carey Show and Married... with Children. Fabian had a recurring role in the 1996 Cinemax television series Erotic Confessions as a character named Jacqueline Stone.

In November 2011, she filed a lawsuit against former companion Neal Schon of Journey, claiming he owes her more than $25,000 for their "express oral nonmarital relationship agreement" when they lived together in San Anselmo. A previous hearing had been set for early October 2012, but was called off when the parties notified the court of an "unconditional settlement" in the case and was scheduled to be dismissed in November. Terms of the settlement were not disclosed in court filings.

Ava Fabian opened up a restaurant ("Ava's") in Los Angeles in 1992.

References

External links
 
 

1962 births
Living people
1980s Playboy Playmates
American film actresses
People from Westchester County, New York
Actresses from New York (state)
American people of Italian descent
People from Brewster, New York
American people of Greek descent
American women restaurateurs
American restaurateurs
21st-century American women